Enrique Rambal (8 May 1924 – 15 December 1971) was a Spanish-Mexican actor. He appeared in more than 60 films between 1952 and 1971. Enrique had married actresses Mercedes Borque and Lucy Gallardo.

Selected filmography
 The Martyr of Calvary (1952)
 Tehuantepec (1954)
 El hombre y el monstruo (1958)
 Love in the Shadows (1960)
 Adventures of Joselito and Tom Thumb (1960)
 Young People (1961)
La mujer dorada
 The Exterminating Angel (1962)
 La casa de las muchachas (1969)

References

External links

1924 births
1971 deaths
Mexican male film actors
Mexican male stage actors
Mexican male telenovela actors
People from Valencia
Spanish emigrants to Mexico
20th-century Mexican male actors